Matthew de la Peña is an American writer of children's books who specializes in novels for young adults. He won the Newbery Medal in 2016 for his book Last Stop on Market Street.

Biography
A San Diego, California, native, Matt de la Peña received his BA from University of the Pacific, which he attended on a basketball scholarship. He then received his MFA in creative writing from San Diego State University.

De la Peña wrote Mexican WhiteBoy in 2008, drawing on his own teenage passion for sports and Mexican heritage. The novel was banned from classrooms in Tucson, Arizona, starting in 2012, when lawmakers passed laws to remove materials containing "critical race theory," until 2017, when the court ruled the law violated the constitutional rights of Mexican American students.

In 2016, de la Peña was honored with the National Council of Teachers of English (NCTE) National Intellectual Freedom Award. In 2015, he wrote Last Stop on Market Street which won the 2016 Newbery Medal. In 2021, he published Milo Imagines the World, which was named to the 2022 Bank Street Children's Best Books of the Year List with an "Outstanding Merit" distinction and shared the Committee's Josette Frank Award with Angeline Boulley's Firekeeper's Daughter.

, he resides in Southern California. He teaches creative writing at San Diego State University.

Books

References

External links

 
 
 
 2005 ALA-YALSA Best Book for Young Adults
 2006 ALA-YALSA Quick Picks for Reluctant Readers
 2009 ALA-YALSA Best Books for Young Adults
 2010 ALA-YALSA Best Books for Young Adults
 2010 ALA-YALSA Quick Picks for Reluctant Readers
 2011 ALA-YALSA Quick Picks for Reluctant Readers

Living people
21st-century American novelists
American young adult novelists
American male novelists
Pacific Tigers men's basketball players
San Diego State University alumni
Year of birth missing (living people)
Place of birth missing (living people)
Newbery Medal winners
21st-century American male writers
American men's basketball players